3080 may refer to:

In general
 3080, a number in the 3000 (number) range
 A.D. 3080, a year of the 4th millennium CE
 3080 BC, a year in the 4th millennium BCE

Roads numbered 3080
 Hawaii Route 3080, a state highway
 Kentucky Route 3080, a state highway
 Texas Farm to Market Road 3080, a state highway
 A3080, one of the A roads in Zone 3 of the Great Britain numbering scheme

Other uses
 3080 Moisseiev, an asteroid in the Asteroid Belt, the 3080th asteroid registered
 IBM 3080 series, a mainframe computer
 HT 3080C, a microcomputer

See also

 Lima Hamilton A-3080, a diesel locomotive